The 2009 Judo Grand Slam Moscow was held in Moscow, Russia, from 30 to 31 May 2009.

Medal summary

Men's events

Women's events

Source Results

Medal table

References

External links
 

2009 IJF World Tour
2009 Judo Grand Slam
Judo
Judo competitions in Russia
Judo
Judo